Šamaš-mudammiq, inscribed mdŠamaš-mumudammiq (mdUTU-mu-SIG5), meaning “Šamaš shows favor,” was the 4th king of Babylon in a sequence designated as the Dynasty of E and ruled during the latter part of the 10th century BC. He was contemporary with the Assyrian king Adad-Nārāri II with whom he sparred.

Biography

Of unknown ancestry, the duration of his reign is equally uncertain. That he followed Mār-bῑti-áḫḫē-idinna is indicated by the sequence on the Assyrian Synchronistic King List, but Assyrian contact was scanty and this may merely record those rulers who had interacted, omitting those who did not. His rule marks the resumption of contacts characterized as “battles, alliances, shifting of borders, and (later) diplomatic marriages that seem to have bound the two countries together.”

The Annals of Adad-Nārāri II record that the Assyrian king conducted a campaign against Babylonia during the last decade of the 10th century although the precise chronology is vague, perhaps between 908 and 902 BC. He claims to have defeated Šamaš-muddamiq who “set up a line of battle at the foot of Mount Yalman,” possibly southeastern Jebel Hamrin, when he attempted to make a stand in the pass and “his chariots, and teams of horses, (Adad-Nārāri) took away from him.”

The fortresses were on the middle Euphrates, less than 100 miles from Babylon.

Notes

Inscriptions

References 

10th-century BC Babylonian kings
9th-century BC Babylonian kings
10th-century BC rulers